A bear claw is a type of pastry.

Bear claw or bear claws may also refer to:
 The claw of a bear
 Bear claw, a style of winter boot sold at such retailers as Sam's Club
 Bear Claw Casino & Hotel, near Carlyle, Saskatchewan, Canada
 Bear Claw Nebula, an emission nebula and star-forming region
 "Bear Claws," a 2017 single by The Academic
  Berenklauw, a fried Dutch snack